EHL Hospitality Business School, formerly known as École hôtelière de Lausanne is a hospitality management school in Switzerland. The school is consistently regarded as the best hospitality school in the world. It trains students whose goals are to obtain managerial careers in the hotel and hospitality industries.

Its campus is located in Le Chalet-à-Gobet, eight kilometers from the city center of Lausanne. Today, the school welcomes more than 3,200 students from 123 different countries.

EHL is a member of EHL Group, which was founded in 2015 and is dedicated to hospitality management education. This reorganization was aimed at fostering management transparency and facilitating partnerships abroad.

History
Founded in 1893 by Jacques Tschumi, Ecole hôtelière de Lausanne is the oldest hotel school in the world. It opened during the tourism boom in Switzerland in the late 19th century in response to high demand for skilled and qualified personnel.

In 1994, EHL launched its new Bachelor of Science in International Hospitality Management

In 2001, EHL launched an EMBA (Executive Master in Hospitality Administration) program, a graduate degree in hospitality management from the University of Applied Sciences and Arts of Western Switzerland (HES-SO).

Education
It prepares students for senior international positions in the field through five programs:

 The Bachelor of Science in International Hospitality Management (taught in English or French), which includes a preparatory year of immersion into the hospitality industry, three years of coursework studying business management topics, two six-month internships (often taken abroad), and a 10-week consulting mandate
 The Master of Science in Global Hospitality Business, a three-semester program in partnership with the Hong Kong Polytechnic University and the University of Houston, with courses taught in Lausanne (Switzerland), Hong Kong (China) and Houston (United States)
 The MBA in Hospitality, delivered 80% online starting September 2017
 The Executive MBA in Hospitality Administration, a 12-month post-graduate program in hotel and hospitality management
 The Master Class in Culinary Arts, a six-month certificate focused on the advanced aspects of culinary arts such as international cuisine, gastronomy and baking

EHL offers financial support to talented students who are unable to enroll due to financial hardship.

Students, staff and teachers follow the EHL dress code, which is viewed as an additional asset for developing student potential.

Campus

The EHL campus contains several training restaurants for students in the preparatory year, including the Berceau des Sens, a gourmet restaurant that is open to the public and recognized by the Gault Millau guide. In 2019, the restaurant was awarded One Michelin Star. It also has several bars, 48 classrooms, auditoriums, a library, study rooms, a wine tasting room, a cafeteria, a boutique, a historic building, sports areas, and dorms.

EHL has adopted several sustainability initiatives, including a waste management system, vegetable garden, heat recovery system for cold storage, solar panels, and two electric cars on campus.

In 2013, EHL launched a project to further develop its campus through a collaborative exchange of ideas involving 385 architecture and landscape design students from around the world. Preparatory work should start in the fall of 2016, and should end within four years. The cost of the project is estimated at 226 million Swiss francs.

After having received the EduTrust certification from Singaporean authorities last June, Ecole hôtelière de Lausanne has now secured the location of its future campus to open in September 2021. The building located at 3 Lady Hill Road in the Orchard Road area will receive its first cohort in the fall of 2021. Once a boarding school for the children of British soldiers, the former Kinloss House has been completely restored to its former classic beauty. This 2,400 square meter building set on 1.9 hectares of land used to be the executive training center for a major global company. The property houses classrooms, meeting rooms, a large multi-purpose hall and numerous break out spaces. This location has been selected based on several factors such as potential for student life, quality and aesthetics, flexibility to accommodate modern learning formats, its peaceful environment to facilitate learning, proximity to some of the main touristic landmarks and an opportunity to offer an EHL experience with a genuinely local flavor.

Student life
EHL students have created several committees for various interests, including sports, photography, food, arts, entrepreneurship and career development such as the Young Hoteliers Summit, whose goal is to bring together established professionals and aspiring leaders of the hospitality industry to share ideas and knowledge which would accelerate progress in the industry.

Admissions
Candidates for the Bachelor program are selected after a review of their application materials as well as an online assessment with analytical and quantitative tests, a hospitality aptitude test, and an online interview. The process is divided into three parts. Submitting of profile and essay online, then if accepted candidates take an online interview with aptitude tests, following this; if successful, applicants are invited to a selection day which includes a campus tour, an hour long interview with a teacher or staff member along with a student ambassador, and a team building activity.

Accreditations
Ecole hôtelière de Lausanne is accredited as an Institution of Higher Education, issued by the New England Association of Schools and Colleges (NEASC, USA). This accreditation ensures that the institution meets the international standards of higher education, and facilitates credit transfers and degree recognition from American institutions.

Within Switzerland, it is the only hospitality school offering training affiliated with the University of Applied Sciences and Arts of Western Switzerland (HES-SO), attesting to the high teaching quality and allowing the issued qualifications to be protected by Swiss law.

The Executive MBA in Hospitality Administration program was recognized by the Swiss Center of Accreditation and Quality Assurance in Higher Education (AAQ) as meeting their quality standards.

Rankings
Based on a study done by TNS Sofres in 2007, 2010 and 2013 with managers and recruiters from the hospitality world, EHL is considered to be the best in the world with regard to graduate job placement in international hospitality careers.

In 2013 and 2014, EHL was named the Best Hospitality Management School in the international competition of the Worldwide Hospitality Awards.

In 2019 EHL was ranked No.1 Worldwide by QS World University Rankings (Hospitality and Leisure Management category.

EHL also ranked No.1 on the list of the best hospitality and hotel management schools in the world (CEO World Magazine, 2019)

Faculty and research
Since 2014, the EHL research center, in partnership with STR, has sought to become a premier source of research in the field of international hospitality. The EHL Food & Beverage Chair, supported by the food production and marketing group Saviva, has studied the changes and challenges of the restaurant industry market since 2010. The METRO Innovation Chair is dedicated to research and innovation in the hospitality and restaurant field.

Many gastronomy experts are part of the school's faculty, including several Meilleurs Ouvriers de France (MOF).

Collaboration with industry
EHL incorporates market trends and new technologies in its teaching through collaborative projects with companies. The Student Business Projects allow companies to appoint a full-time team of students to work on a topic that they need a solution for.

Every year, students can attend the on-campus Career Fair, allowing them to meet potential employers for internships or permanent positions.

A Business Incubator was established in 2012 to support start-ups who want to start in the hospitality sector.

EHL has established an International Advisory Board composed of international leaders in the hospitality and education sector, which provides the school with an opportunity to benefit from direct feedback and experiences from the industry.

Partnerships
Through its subsidiary, EHL Advisory Services, EHL Group provides consulting services and manager training from its offices in Switzerland, China and India. EHL Advisory Services has developed a network of certified schools to recognize institutions when they become top notch. To date, it has issued EHL certification to the following schools:

 Algeria - Ecole Supérieure d'Hôtellerie et Restauration d'Alger
 China - Beijing Hospitality Institute
 China - Hospitality Institute of SanYa
 China - Guilin Tourism University
 India - Indian School of Hospitality
 India - DICE School of Hospitality and Culinary Arts
 Jordan - Royal Academy of Culinary Arts (Associate Member to the Network of EHL-Certified Schools)
 Lebanon - Université La Sagesse, Faculty of Hospitality Management 
 Mexico - Centro de Estudios Superiores de San Ángel
 Philippines - Dusit Hospitality Management College
 Thailand - Dusit Thani College
 Saudi Arabia - King Abdulaziz University Tourism Institute

In November 2013, EHL acquired the Swiss School of Tourism and Hospitality (SSTH) at Passugg, Switzerland, which teaches tourism, gastronomy and hospitality.

Alumni
The EHL Alumni Association (AEHL) was established in 1926. Nearly 500 former students became members during its first year of existence, including the directors of prestigious hotel establishments located in Switzerland and abroad. Today, AEHL fosters a network of 25,000 active members in 120 countries.

Notable members:
 Bernhard Bohnenberger (1986), President, Six Senses Hotels Resorts Spas
 Peter C. Borer (1975), COO, The Peninsula Hotels and executive director, The Hongkong and Shanghai Hotels Limited
 Christopher W. Norton (1980), President, Global Product and Operations, Four Seasons Hotels and Resorts
 Georges Plassat (1972), CEO, Carrefour Group
 Kurt Eduard Ritter (1970), CEO, The Rezidor Hotel Group
 Hans Wiedemann (1978), managing director and Delegate of the Board, Badrutt's Palace Hotel
 Christian Clerc (1992), President, Hotel Operations - Europe, Middle East and Africa, Four Seasons Hotels and Resorts
 Nathalie Seiler-Hayez (1995), managing director, Beau-Rivage Palace, Lausanne
 Jacky Lorenzetti (1969), Founder, Fonica Group and President, Racing Métro 92 Rugby
 Philippe Durand-Daguin (1965), Founder, Eurent Group
 François Dussart (1990), managing director, Beau-Rivage Palace SA
 Philippe Peverelli (1985), CEO, Montres Tudor SA (Rolex group)
 Alain Delamuraz (1988), Vice President and Head of Marketing, Blancpain SA
 Lorenzo Stoll (1996), CEO Suisse Romande Swiss International Air Lines, Switzerland
 Mathieu Jaton (1999), CEO, Montreux Jazz Festival
 Arnaud Bertrand (2008), Founder, Housetrip
 Dominique Seiler (1990), Head of Talent Acquisition, UBS Switzerland
 Flo Sander (2001), managing director, iThink Consulting Group
 Alain Kropf (1990), General Manager, Royal Savoy Hotel Lausanne
 Tomas Feier (1992), General Manager Disneyland Hotel, European Hotel Managers Association
 Christophe Laure (1990), General Manager, InterContinental Le Grand Hotel Paris
 Michel Jauslin (1972), Area Vice President, Hyatt Hotels & Resorts
 Simon Rusconi (1990), Vice President of Operations, Morgans Hotel Group
 Claude Membrez (1990), General Manager, Palexpo

Gallery

See also

EHL Wolves
List of largest universities by enrollment in Switzerland

References

External links
ehl.edu, Official website

1893 establishments in Switzerland

Educational institutions established in 1893
Hospitality schools in Switzerland
Organisations based in Lausanne
Universities of Applied Sciences in Switzerland
Education in Lausanne